The Naval Assistant to the First Sea Lord also known as the Executive Assistant to the First Sea Lord  was a senior appointment  of the Royal Navy established in 1905 until 2014. The post holder was responsible for assisting the First Sea Lord in the discharging of his duties and responsible for administrative and secretarial work within the private office of the First Sea Lord.

History
Prior to 1905 the Sea Lords were without a specific naval officer responsible for secretarial duties within their respective offices, that particular duty was undertaken by random secretaries selected from within the secretarial pool at the Admiralty. The first incumbent was Captain, Charles E. Madden. The post holder was primarily responsible for administrative and secretarial duties within the private office of the First Sea Lord. Occasionally they were referred to as the Executive Assistant to the First Sea Lord. They were occasionally in attendance with 1SL at Navy Board meetings. The final incumbent was Commander, David J.D. Dominy.

Until 2010 the naval assistant usually held the rank of Captain later Commander.

Naval assistants
Included:
 Captain Charles E. Madden: December 1905-August 1907
 Captain Archibald G.H.W. Moore: August 1907-December 1908
 Captain Henry F. Oliver: December 1908-January 1912
 Captain Charles M. de Bartolome: January 1912-August 1914
 Captain T. Percy H. Beamish: August–October 1914
 Captain Thomas E. Crease: October 1914-May 1915
 Captain A. Dudley P.R. Pound: January–October 1915
 Captain Allan F. Everett: July 1915-December 1916
 Captain Edward M. Phillpotts: December 1916-October 1917
 Captain John P.R. Marriott: April 1918-November 1919
 Captain Roger M. Bellairs: November 1919-October 1925
 Captain Sidney R. Bailey: October 1925-November 1927
 Captain William M. James: November 1927-March 1929
 Captain Herbert Fitzherbert: March 1929-? 1930
 Captain Guy Grantham: June 1939-May 1940
 Captain Cecil C.A.Allen: May 1940-May 1941
 Captain John W.A. Waller: May 1941-March 1942
 Captain Francis H.W. Goolden: March 1942-February 1943
 Captain Geoffrey Thistleton-Smith: February 1943-January 1945
 Captain George K. Collett: January 1945-February 1946
 Captain Sir Charles E. Madden, Bt.: February 1946-July 1947
 Captain Walter A. Adair: July 1947-September 1948
 Captain Christopher T. Jellicoe: September 1948-September 1950
 Captain Peter W. Gretton: September 1950-May 1952
 Captain Charles W. Malins: May 1952-April 1954
 Captain F. Brian P. Brayne-Nicholls: April 1954-December 1955
 Captain Peter N. Howes: December 1955-December 1957
 Captain L. Derek Empson: December 1957-August 1959
 Captain J. Anthony R. Troup: August 1959-August 1961
 Captain David Williams: August 1961-January 1964
 Captain David G. Roome: January 1964-March 1966
 Captain Michael R. Collins: March 1966-April 1968
 Captain Martin La T. Wemyss: April 1968 – 1970
 Captain John F. Cadell: 1970-August 1972
 Captain David G. Armytage: August 1972-July 1974
 Captain Richard G.A. Fitch: July 1974-May 1976
 Captain D. Benjamin Bathurst: May 1976-June 1978
 Captain John F. Coward: June 1978-June 1980
 Captain George M. Tullis: June 1980-January 1983
 Captain John F.S. Trinder: January 1983-September 1984
 Captain Thomas M. Le Marchand: September 1984-August 1986
 Captain Peter M. Franklyn: August 1986-April 1988
 Captain William C. McKnight: April–December 1988
 Captain R. John Lippiett: December 1988 – 1990
 Captain Michael G. Wood: 1991-1992
 Captain A. James G. Miller: 1993-1998
 Captain Ian F. Corder: 1999-2001
 Captain James A. Morse: 2002-November 2004
 Captain Jeremy J.F. Blunden: November 2004-November 2006
 Commander William N. Entwisle: 2007-2008
 Captain James D. Morley: 2009-2010
 Commander Iain S. Lower: 2010-2011
 Commander David J.D. Dominy: September 2012-September 2014

Additional Naval Assistants to the First Sea Lord
Included:
 Captain Sydney S. Hall, 31 October 1914 – 8 February 1915 
 Captain Dudley Pound, 20 March 1915 – 24 October 1915  
 Paymaster-in-Chief Hamnet H. Share, 4 December 1916 – October, 1917 
 Commander Ralph F. Seymour, 3 November 1919 – 22 March 1920

References

Royal Navy appointments